Indigenous peoples of the Northeastern Woodlands include Native American tribes and First Nation bands residing in or originating from a cultural area encompassing the northeastern and Midwest United States and southeastern Canada. It is part of a broader grouping known as the Eastern Woodlands. The Northeastern Woodlands is divided into three major areas: the Coastal, Saint Lawrence Lowlands, and Great Lakes-Riverine zones.

The Coastal area includes the Atlantic Provinces in Canada, the Atlantic seaboard of the United States, south until North Carolina. The Saint Lawrence Lowlands area includes parts of Southern Ontario, upstate New York, much of the Saint Lawrence River area, and Susquehanna Valley. The Great Lakes-Riverine area includes the remaining inland areas of the northeast, home to Central Algonquian and Siouan speakers.

The Great Lakes region is sometimes considered a distinct cultural region, due to the large concentration of tribes in the area. The Northeastern Woodlands region is bound by the Subarctic to the north, the Great Plains to the west, and the Southeastern Woodlands to the south.

List of peoples

Abenaki (Tarrantine), Quebec, Maine, New Brunswick, historically Vermont and New Hampshire
Eastern Abenaki, Quebec, Maine, and historically New Hampshire
Kennebec (Caniba), Maine
Western Abenaki: Quebec, Massachusetts, historically New Hampshire and Vermont
Anishinaabeg (Anishinabe, Neshnabé, Nishnaabe) (see also Subarctic, Plains)
Algonquin, Quebec, Ontario
Nipissing, Ontario
Ojibwe (Chippewa, Ojibwa), Ontario, Michigan, Minnesota, and Wisconsin
Mississaugas, Ontario
Saulteaux (Nakawē), Ontario
Odawa people (Ottawa), Indiana, Michigan, Ohio, Ontario, also currently Oklahoma; later Oklahoma
Potawatomi, Illinois, Indiana, Michigan, Ontario, Wisconsin; also currently Kansas and Oklahoma
Assateague, formerly Maryland
Attawandaron (Neutral), Ontario
Beothuk, formerly Newfoundland
Chowanoke, formerly North Carolina
Choptank people, formerly Maryland
Conoy, Virginia, Maryland
Erie, formerly Pennsylvania, New York
Etchemin, Maine
Ho-Chunk (Winnebago), southern Wisconsin, northern Illinois, later Iowa and Nebraska
 Honniasont, formerly Pennsylvania, Ohio, West Virginia
 Hopewell tradition, formerly Ohio, Illinois, and Kentucky, and Black River region, 200 BCE—500 CE
 Housatonic, formerly Massachusetts, New York
Illinois Confederacy (Illiniwek), Illinois, Iowa, and Missouri; descendants in Oklahoma
Cahokia, Illinois, Iowa, Missouri, Arkansas, descendants in Oklahoma
Kaskaskia, formerly Wisconsin, descendants in Oklahoma
Miami, Illinois, Indiana, and Michigan, now Oklahoma
Iroquois Confederacy (Haudenosaunee), Ontario, Quebec, and New York
Cayuga, New York, Oklahoma
Mohawk, New York, Ontario and Quebec
Oneida, New York and Wisconsin
Onondaga, New York
Seneca, New York, Oklahoma
Mingo, Pennsylvania, Ohio, West Virginia
Tuscarora, formerly North Carolina, now New York
Kickapoo, Michigan, Illinois, Missouri, now Kansas, Oklahoma, Texas, Mexico
Laurentian (St. Lawrence Iroquoians), formerly New York, Ontario, and Quebec, 14th century—1580 CE
Lenni Lenape (Delaware), Pennsylvania, Delaware, New Jersey, now Ontario and Oklahoma
Munsee-speaking subgroups, formerly Long Island and southeastern New York
Canarsie (Canarsee), formerly Long Island New York
Esopus, formerly New York, later Ontario and Wisconsin
Hackensack, formerly New York
Haverstraw (Rumachenanck), New York
Kitchawank (Kichtawanks, Kichtawank), New York
Minisink, formerly New York
Navasink, formerly to the east along the north shore of New Jersey
Raritan, formerly Westchester County, New York
Sinsink (Sintsink), formerly Westchester County, New York
Siwanoy, formerly Massachusetts
Tappan, formerly New York
Waoranecks
Wappinger (Wecquaesgeek, Nochpeem), formerly New York
Warranawankongs
Wiechquaeskeck, formerly New York
Unami-speaking subgroups
Acquackanonk, formerly Passaic River in northern New Jersey
Okehocking, formerly southeast Pennsylvania
Unalachtigo, Delaware, New Jersey
 Mahican (Stockbridge Mahican) Connecticut, Massachusetts, New York, and Vermont
 Manahoac, Virginia
 Mascouten, formerly Michigan
 Massachusett, formerly Massachusetts
Ponkapoag, formerly Massachusetts
 Meherrin, Virginia, North Carolina
 Menominee, Wisconsin
Meskwaki (Fox), Michigan, now Iowa
 Mi'kmaq (Micmac), New Brunswick, Newfoundland and Labrador, Nova Scotia, Prince Edward Island, Quebec, and Maine
Mitchigamea, formerly Illinois
Moingona, formerly Illinois
Peoria, Illinois, now Oklahoma
Tamaroa, formerly Illinois
Wea, formerly Indiana, descendants in Oklahoma
 Mohegan, Connecticut
 Monacan, Virginia
 Montaukett (Montauk), New York
 Monyton (Monetons, Monekot, Moheton) (Siouan), West Virginia and Virginia
 Nansemond, Virginia
 Nanticoke, Delaware and Maryland
Accohannock
 Narragansett, Rhode Island
 Niantic, coastal Connecticut
 Nipmuc (Nipmuck), Connecticut, Massachusetts, and Rhode Island
 Nottaway, Virginia
 Occaneechi (Occaneechee), Virginia
Pamplico, North Carolina
Passamaquoddy, New Brunswick, Nova Scotia, Quebec, and Maine
Patuxent, Maryland
Paugussett, Connecticut
Potatuck, New York
Pawtucket, Massachusetts, New Hampshire
Naumkeag, Massachusetts
Penobscot, Maine
Pennacook, Massachusetts, New Hampshire
Pequot, Connecticut
Petun (Tionontate), Ontario
Piscataway, Maryland
Pocumtuc, western Massachusetts
 Podunk, New York, eastern Hartford County, Connecticut
Powhatan Confederacy, Virginia
Appomattoc, Virginia
Arrohateck, Virginia
Chesapeake, Virginia
Chesepian, Virginia
Chickahominy, Virginia
Kiskiack, Virginia
Mattaponi, Virginia
Nansemond, Virginia
Pamunkey, Virginia
Paspahegh, Virginia
Powhatan, Virginia
 Quinnipiac, Connecticut, eastern New York, northern New Jersey
 Rappahannock, Virginia
 Sauk (Sac), Michigan, now Iowa, Oklahoma
 Schaghticoke, western Connecticut
  Secotan Outerbanks, North Carolina
 Croatoan
 Dasamongueponke 
 Roanoke people
 Shawnee, formerly Ohio, Virginia, West Virginia, Pennsylvania, Kentucky, currently Oklahoma
 Shinnecock, Long Island, New York
 Stegarake, Virginia
 Stuckanox (Stukanox), Virginia
 Conestoga (Susquehannock), Maryland, Pennsylvania, New York, West Virginia
 Tauxenent (Doeg), Virginia
 Tunxis, Connecticut
 Tuscarora, formerly North Carolina, Virginia, currently New York
 Tutelo (Nahyssan), Virginia
 Unquachog (Poospatuck), Long Island, New York
 Wabanaki, Maine, New Brunswick, Nova Scotia, Quebec
 Wampanoag, Massachusetts
 Nauset, Massachusetts
 Patuxet, Massachusetts
 Pokanoket, Massachusetts, Rhode Island
 Wangunk, Mattabeset, Connecticut  
 Wenro, New York
 Wicocomico, Maryland, Virginia
 Wolastoqiyik, Maliseet, Maine, New Brunswick, Nova Scotia, and Quebec
 Wyachtonok, Connecticut, New York
 Wyandot (Huron), Ontario south of Georgian Bay, now Oklahoma, Kansas, Michigan, and Wendake, Quebec

First Nations in Canada

United States Federally Recognized tribes 

 Absentee-Shawnee Tribe of Indians of Oklahoma
 Bad River Band of the Lake Superior Tribe of Chippewa Indians of the Bad River Reservation, Wisconsin
 Bay Mills Indian Community, Michigan
 Cayuga Nation of New York
 Chickahominy people, Virginia
 Chippewa-Cree Indians of the Rocky Boy’s Reservation, Montana
 Citizen Potawatomi Nation, Oklahoma
 Delaware Nation, Oklahoma
 Delaware Tribe of Indians, Oklahoma
 Eastern Chickahominy, Virginia 
 Eastern Shawnee Tribe of Oklahoma
 Forest County Potawatomi Community, Wisconsin
 Grand Traverse Band of Ottawa and Chippewa Indians, Michigan
 Hannahville Indian Community, Michigan
 Ho-Chunk Nation of Wisconsin, Minnesota, Wisconsin
 Houlton Band of Maliseet Indians of Maine
 Iowa Tribe of Kansas and Nebraska, also considered a Great Plains tribe
 Iowa Tribe of Oklahoma, also considered a Great Plains tribe
 Keweenaw Bay Indian Community, Michigan
 Kickapoo Traditional Tribe of Texas
 Kickapoo Tribe of Indians of the Kickapoo Reservation in Kansas
 Kickapoo Tribe of Oklahoma
 Lac Courte Oreilles Band of Lake Superior Chippewa Indians of Wisconsin
 Lac du Flambeau Band of Lake Superior Chippewa Indians of the Lac du Flambeau Reservation of Wisconsin
 Lac Vieux Desert Band of Lake Superior Chippewa Indians, Michigan
 Little River Band of Ottawa Indians, Michigan
 Little Traverse Bay Bands of Odawa Indians, Michigan
 Mashantucket Pequot Tribe of Connecticut
 Mashpee Wampanoag Tribe, Massachusetts
 Match-e-be-nash-she-wish Band of Pottawatomi Indians of Michigan
 Menominee Indian Tribe of Wisconsin
 Miami Tribe of Oklahoma
 Mi'kmaq Nation, Maine
 Minnesota Chippewa Tribe, MinnesotaSix component reservations:
 Bois Forte Band (Nett Lake)
 Fond du Lac Band, Minnesota, Wisconsin
 Grand Portage Band
 Leech Lake Band
 Mille Lacs Band
 White Earth Band
 Mohegan Indian Tribe of Connecticut
 Monacan, Virginia
 Nansemond, Virginia 
 Narragansett Indian Tribe of Rhode Island
 Nottawaseppi Huron Band of the Potawatomi, Michigan
 Oneida Nation of New York
 Oneida Tribe of Indians of Wisconsin
 Onondaga Nation of New York
 Ottawa Tribe of Oklahoma
 Pamunkey, Virginia
 Passamaquoddy Tribe of Maine
 Penobscot Tribe of Maine
 Peoria Tribe of Indians of Oklahoma
 Pokagon Band of Potawatomi Indians, Michigan, Indiana
 Prairie Band of Potawatomi Nation, Kansas
 Prairie Island Indian Community in the State of Minnesota
 Rappahannock, Virginia 
 Red Cliff Band of Lake Superior Chippewa Indians of Wisconsin
 Red Lake Band of Chippewa Indians, Minnesota
 Sac and Fox Nation, Oklahoma
 Sac and Fox Nation of Missouri in Kansas and Nebraska
 Saginaw Chippewa Indian Tribe of Michigan
 St. Croix Chippewa Indians of Wisconsin
 Saint Regis Mohawk Tribe, New York
 Sault Ste. Marie Tribe of Chippewa Indians of Michigan
 Seneca-Cayuga Tribe of Oklahoma
 Seneca Nation of New York
 Shawnee Tribe, Oklahoma
 Shinnecock Nation, New York
 Sokaogon Chippewa Community, Wisconsin
 Stockbridge Munsee Community, Wisconsin
 Tonawanda Band of Seneca Indians of New York
 Turtle Mountain Band of Chippewa Indians of North Dakota, Montana, North Dakota
 Tuscarora Nation of New York
 Wampanoag Tribe of Gay Head (Aquinnah) of Massachusetts
 Winnebago Tribe of Nebraska

History

Around 200 B.C the Hopewell culture began to develop across the Midwest of what is now the United  States, with its epicenter in Ohio. The Hopewell culture was defined by its extensive trading system that connected communities throughout the Eastern region, from the Great Lakes to Florida. A sophisticated artwork style developed for its goods, depicting a multitude of animals such as deer, bear, and birds. The Hopewell culture is also noted for its impressive ceremonial sites, which typically contain a burial mound and  geometric earthworks. The most notable of these sites is in the Scioto River Valley (from Columbus to Portsmouth, Ohio) and adjacent Paint Creek, centered on Chillicothe, Ohio. The Hopewell culture began to decline from around 400 A.D. for reasons which remain unclear.

By around 1100, the distinct Iroquoian-speaking and Algonquian-speaking cultures had developed in what would become New York State and New England. Prominent Algonquian tribes included the Abenakis, Mi'kmaq, Penobscot, Pequots, Mohegans, Narragansetts, Pocumtucks, and Wampanoag. The Mi'kmaq, Maliseet, Passamaquoddy, Abenaki, and Penobscot tribes formed the Wabanaki Confederacy in the seventeenth century. The Confederacy covered roughly most of present-day Maine in the United States, and New Brunswick, mainland Nova Scotia, Cape Breton Island, Prince Edward Island and some of Quebec south of the St. Lawrence River in Canada. The Western Abenaki live on lands in New Hampshire, Vermont, and Massachusetts of the United States.

The five nations of the Iroquois League developed a powerful confederacy about the 15th century that controlled territory throughout present-day New York, into Pennsylvania and around the Great Lakes. The Iroquois confederacy or Haudenosaunee became the most powerful political grouping in the Northeastern woodlands, and still exists today. The confederacy consists of the Mohawk, Cayuga, Oneida, Onondaga, Seneca and Tuscarora tribes.

The area that is now the states of New Jersey and Delaware was inhabited by the Lenni-Lenape or Delaware, who were also an Algonquian people. Most Lenape were pushed out of their homeland in the 18th century by expanding European colonies, and now the majority of them live in Oklahoma.

Culture

Wampum consisted of small beads made from quahog shells.

The birchbark canoe was first used by the Algonquin Indians and its use later spread to other tribes and to early French explorers, missionaries and fur traders. The canoes were used for carrying goods,  and for hunting, fishing, and warfare, and varied in length from about 4.5 metres (15 feet) to about 30 metres (100 feet) in length for some large war canoes.

The main agricultural crops of the region were the Three Sisters : winter squash, maize (corn), and climbing beans (usually tepary beans or common beans). Originating in Mesoamerica, these three crops were carried northward over centuries to many parts of North America. The three crops were normally planted together using a technique known as companion planting on flat-topped mounds of soil. The three crops were planted in this way as each benefits from the proximity of the others. The tall maize plants provide a structure for the beans to climb, while the beans provide nitrogen to the soil that benefits the other plants. Meanwhile, the squash spreads along the ground, blocking the sunlight to prevent weeds from growing and retaining moisture in the soil.

Prior to contact Native groups in the Northeast generally lived in villages of a few hundred people, living close to their crops. Generally men did the planting and harvesting, while women processed the crops. However, some settlements could be much bigger, such as Hochelaga (modern-day Montreal), which had a population of several thousand people, and Cahokia, which may have housed 20,000 residents between 1050 and 1150 CE.

For many tribes, the fundamental social group was a clan, which was often named after an animal such as turtle, bear, wolf or hawk. The totem animal concerned was considered sacred and had a special relationship with the members of the clan.

The spiritual beliefs of the Algonquians center around the concept of Manitou, which is the spiritual and fundamental life force that is omnipresent. Manitou also manifest itself as the Great Spirit or Gitche Manitou, who is the creator and giver of all life. The Haudenosaunee equivalent of Manitou is orenda.

See also
 Classification of indigenous peoples of the Americas
 Hopewell tradition
 Native American tribes in Massachusetts
 Southern New England Algonquian cuisine
 Three Sisters (agriculture)
 War of 1812

Notes

References
 Trigger, Bruce C. "Introduction." William C. Sturtevant, general ed. Handbook of North American Indians. Washington, DC: Smithsonian Institution, 1978.
 Trigger, Bruce, volume ed. Sturtevant, William C., general ed. Handbook of North American Indians. Washington, DC: Smithsonian Institution, 1978.

 
Northeastern Woodlands
Northeastern Woodlands
First Nations
Native American tribes
Northeastern Woodlands
Indigenous culture of the Northeastern Woodlands